Petru Soltan (June 29, 1931 – July 15, 2016) was a Moldovan mathematician. He was a member of the Academy of Sciences of Moldova and an honorary member of the Romanian Academy. Petru Soltan was a member of the Mathematical Society of Moldova.

Petru Soltan served as member of the Parliament of Moldova (1990–1994) and is a leader of the Democratic Forum of Romanians in Moldova.

He died on 15 July 2016 at the age of 86.

Awards and honours
 Doctor Honoris Causa Babeș-Bolyai University, Cluj-Napoca (1992),
 Doctor Honoris Causa Academy of Economic Studies of Moldova (1998)
 Doctor Honoris Causa al Universităţii Pedagogice de Stat din Tiraspol, cu sediul la Chişinău (2000).
 Doctor Magna cum Laudae al ULIM (1994),
 Honorary Professor Petre Andrei University of Iași (2001).
 Membru titular Academy of Sciences of Moldova (din 1992),
 honorary member Romanian Academy, 1993.
 Om emerit al Republicii Moldova (1994),
 Medals Acad. S. I. Vavilov (Moscova, 1991),
 Medal "Meritul Civic" (1996),
 Medal Mihai Eminescu (2000),
 Medal Dimitrie Cantemir (Academy of Sciences of Moldova, 2001).
 Moldova's National Prize in Science and Technology, 2004

Bibliography 
 Enciciclopedia Sovietică moldovenească, Chişinău
 Petru Soltan. Colectiv de autori. Calendarul Naţional, 2001, pp. 139–141
 Gheorghe Rusnac, Valeriu Cozma, Profesorii Universităţii de stat din Moldova. Chişinău, Ed. USM, 2001.
 Tudor Ţopa, Voievozii înspiraţiei, Chişinău, 2007, pp. 42–54.

References

External links 
 Mathematical Society of the Republic of Moldova, An overview over the state of the mathematical activities in the Republic of Moldova

1931 births
2016 deaths
Moldovan writers
Moldovan male writers
People from Dubăsari District
Moldovan MPs 1990–1994
Titular members of the Academy of Sciences of Moldova
Honorary members of the Romanian Academy
20th-century Moldovan mathematicians
21st-century Moldovan mathematicians